Vladimir Mikhailovich Shevchuk (born 9 May 1954) is a Russian professional football coach and a former player.

Coaching career
From 26 June to 18 July 2018, Vladimir was an assistant manager with FC Urozhay Krasnodar.

References

External links
 Career summary by KLISF

1954 births
Living people
Soviet footballers
Russian footballers
FC Shakhtar Donetsk players
FC Irtysh Pavlodar players
FC Kairat players
FC Lokomotiv Moscow players
FC Dnipro players
FC Elektrometalurh-NZF Nikopol players
Russian football managers
FC Saturn Ramenskoye managers
FC Sokol Saratov managers
FC Khimki managers
FC Spartak Vladikavkaz managers
Russian expatriate sportspeople in Kazakhstan
Russian Premier League managers
Association football midfielders
FC Neftekhimik Nizhnekamsk players
People from Magnitogorsk
Sportspeople from Chelyabinsk Oblast